Vietopotamon is a genus of freshwater crabs, recorded from Thailand (V. phuluangense) and Vietnam (V. aluoiense).  Both are known from single localities and are on the IUCN Red List of Threatened Species.

Species
 Vietopotamon aluoiense Dang & Hô, 2002
 Vietopotamon phuluangense (Bott, 1970)

References

External links

Potamoidea
Freshwater crustaceans of Asia